The Flint RiverQuarium is a  aquarium opened in 2004 and located on the banks of the Flint River in Albany, Georgia, United States.

The aquarium follows the journey of the Flint River, and highlights the ecosystems of the Apalachicola, Chattahoochee and Flint River basins.

Features 
The Flint RiverQuarium features both freshwater and saltwater river ecosystem of Southwest Georgia as well as the world.

It exhibits the diverse life forms of the Flint River, which runs through Southwest Georgia.

The Flint River Gallery includes both freshwater and saltwater fish, and includes a live fish hatchery. In this exhibit, visitors can follow the  journey of the Flint River to the ocean.

Discovery Caverns includes interactive displays and a cave exhibiting subterranean creatures.

The World of Water shows visitors other rivers around the world that share features and challenges with the Flint.

Spring Run Creek is home to the aquarium's alligators.

Although the first inhabitants of this exhibit are commercially available birds such as quail and ducks, the RiverQuarium is working with various groups to obtain non-releasable birds native to the area.

The Adventure Center is across the plaza from the RiverQuarium, and is designed to house traveling exhibits at the Aquarium.

Architecture 
The RiverQuarium was designed by architect Antoine Predock in association with Executive Architect Robbins Bell Kreher, and was completed in 2004. Predock was "inspired by the biology, geology and hydrology of Southwest Georgia" in creating this facility. The facility is part of the Downtown Albany RiverFront Master Plan.  Located on the banks of the Flint River at Pine Avenue and Front Street, it received the American Institute of Architects (AIA) award in 2005. It is one of the city's projects to reconnect the downtown to the river and a walkway along its banks.

The building wraps around the primary exhibit, which is the  naturally landscaped Blue Hole and Cypress Creek. The building is designed to allude to the "complex Ocala limestone terrain of sinks, aquifers, caves and streams that exist below the surface." The Exhibits were designed by Lyons/Zaremba Inc. of Boston, Massachusetts

See also
Radium Springs, Georgia

Notes

References 

Official Web site of Antoine Predock, Architect
Official Web site of Lyons/Zaremba, Inc.

Aquaria in Georgia (U.S. state)
Buildings and structures completed in 2004
Antoine Predock buildings
Buildings and structures in Albany, Georgia
Tourist attractions in Albany, Georgia